is a passenger railway station located in the city of Higashimurayama, Tokyo, Japan, operated by the private railway operator Seibu Railway. The station provides direct access to Seibu Yuenchi Amusement Park and Seibu-en Velodrome.

Lines
Seibuen Station is the terminus of the Seibuen Line, a 2.4 kilometer spur line from Higashi-Murayama Station.

Station layout
The station has one terminating side platform and one terminating island platform. Both platforms are ground-level and are connected by a footbridge.

History
It was renamed  on 1 March 1941. It was renamed to its present name on 23 May 1950. The station was relocated 400 meters north to its present location on 20 September 1961, and was renamed to its present name on 25 March 1975. Station numbering was introduced on all Seibu Railway lines during fiscal 2012, with Seibu-Yūenchi Station becoming "ST07" for the Seibu Tamako Line and "SY01" for the Seibu Yamaguchi Line. A new station building was completed in July 1990.

Station numbering was introduced on all Seibu Railway lines during fiscal 2012, with Seibuen Station becoming "SK06".

Passenger statistics
In fiscal 2019, the station was the 81st busiest on the Seibu network with an average of 3,591 passengers daily. 

The passenger figures for previous years are as shown below.

Surrounding area
Seibu-en Velodrome
Seibu-en

See also
List of railway stations in Japan

References

External links

Seibu Railway page for Seibuen Station

Stations of Seibu Railway
Railway stations in Tokyo
Railway stations in Japan opened in 1930
Seibu Seibuen Line
Higashimurayama, Tokyo